El Buen Fin (short for "El Buen Fin de Semana," meaning "The Good Weekend") is an annual nationwide shopping event in Mexico.  It began in 2011. It occurs the weekend before Mexican Revolution Day, which is observed on the third Monday of November.  On this weekend, major retailers extend their store hours and offer special promotions, including extended credit terms and price promotions.

The purpose of El Buen Fin is to stimulate the economy by encouraging consumption and to improve quality of life through promotions and discounts. It was inspired by the American tradition of Black Friday and emerged as an initiative of Council of Business Coordination, in association with the federal government and private sector organizations.

History
Mexican President Felipe Calderón stated his belief that this move will cushion Mexican economy from the threats of European and US economic difficulties.

The event is organized by
 the Bancos de México's Association
 Mexican Internet Association
 National Association of Supermarkets and Departmental Stores (ANTAD)
 Council of Business Coordinator
 Bosses Confederation of the Mexican Republic (COPARMEX)
 Confederation of National Chambers of Trade, Services and Tourism (Concanaco Servytur)
 Confederation of Industrial Chambers of the United States of Mexico (CONCAMIN), and
 Iniciativa México, in coordination with the Mexico's federal government.

Since 2011, retailers have run campaigns marketing El Buen Fin to be the best time of the year to buy goods.  Critics say that Mexico's Black Friday deals are not helpful for Mexican consumers causing them to go into unnecessary debt as most of the offers are monthly payment deals, package deals (i.e. buy 2, get 1 free) or store credit deals (get $300 for every $1000 spent, for example) and not real discounts. Others, such as furniture store chain Famsa, see it as an opportunity to attract North American buyers, especially in the border cities such as Tijuana, Ciudad Juárez or Reynosa, along with South Texas and Rio Grande Valley consumers to stores in its flagship Monterrey market, as El Buen Fin is scheduled to be about one or two weeks before the US Black Friday.

Mexican civil society consumer rights watchdog El Poder del Consumidor has said that this economic activity has pushed more Mexicans to credit card debts.

Sales during El Buen Fin 2019 reached MXN $118 billion, 115,279 establishments participated in 2019. The event will be held from November 9–20, 2020.

References

External links
El Poder del Consumidor membership to the International Consumer Organizations 
El Buen Fin Official site.

November observances
Unofficial observances
Christmas economics
Retailing in Mexico
Friday observances
Saturday observances
Sunday observances
Monday observances
Holidays and observances by scheduling (nth weekday of the month)